Malcolm Hicks (born 19 October 1987) is a New Zealand long-distance runner. In 2019, he competed in the men's marathon at the 2019 World Athletics Championships held in Doha, Qatar. He finished in 27th place.

Career 

In 2018, he finished in 18th place in the 2018 Berlin Marathon held in Berlin, Germany.

In 2019, Hicks ran the Metro Group Marathon in Dusseldorf, Germany, where he was second in 2:13:51.  Hicks' other marathon of the year was at the 2019 World Championships in Athletics in Doha, Qatar, where he finished 27th in 2:17:45.

On 23 February 2020, Hicks ran the Seville Marathon held in Seville, Spain.  He placed 22nd in a personal best time of 2:10:04.  This performance qualified him to represent his country at the 2020 Tokyo Olympic Games men's marathon.

On 8 August 2021, Hicks competed in the Tokyo Olympic Games Marathon along with compatriot Zane Robertson.  Hicks was placed 64th in 2:23:12 and Robertson was 36th in 2:17:04, behind the winner Eliud Kipchoge.

Competition record

References

External links 
 

Living people
1987 births
Place of birth missing (living people)
New Zealand male long-distance runners
New Zealand male marathon runners
World Athletics Championships athletes for New Zealand
Olympic athletes of New Zealand
Olympic male marathon runners
Athletes (track and field) at the 2020 Summer Olympics